Mariel Municipal Museum is a museum located in the 71st street in Mariel, Cuba. It was established as a museum on 30 December 1981.

The museum holds collections on history, weaponry, archeology, numismatics and decorative arts.

See also 
 List of museums in Cuba

References 

Museums in Cuba
Buildings and structures in Artemisa Province
Museums established in 1981
1981 establishments in Cuba
20th-century architecture in Cuba